Mamadou Traore (born 3 October 1994) is a Malian footballer who plays for Serbian SuperLiga club Vojvodina.

Club career
Traore started his senior career with Elche Ilicitano. After that, he played for Florida Adrenaline and Platense. In 2017, he signed for Marítimo in the Portuguese Primeira Liga. He played for the B squad and the Under-23 team with that club, making one appearance for the first team in Taça da Liga.

On 2 July 2021, he signed a two-year contract with Estrela da Amadora.

International career
He made his debut for Mali national football team on 24 March 2021 in an Africa Cup of Nations qualifier against Guinea.

Career statistics

International

References

External links 
 Mamadou Traore, a Malian who already lives as a Honduran
 Mamadou Traore, the 'Paul Pogba' from Mali looking for an opportunity in Platense
 Mamadou's dream takes shape in Elche
 
 

1994 births
Sportspeople from Bamako
Living people
Malian footballers
Mali international footballers
Association football midfielders
Elche CF Ilicitano footballers
Platense F.C. players
C.S. Marítimo players
S.C.U. Torreense players
C.F. Estrela da Amadora players
Liga Nacional de Fútbol Profesional de Honduras players
Campeonato de Portugal (league) players
FK Vojvodina players
Liga Portugal 2 players
Malian expatriate footballers
Expatriate footballers in Spain
Expatriate soccer players in the United States
Expatriate footballers in Honduras
Expatriate footballers in Portugal
Malian expatriate sportspeople in Spain
Malian expatriate sportspeople in the United States
Malian expatriate sportspeople in Honduras
Malian expatriate sportspeople in Portugal
21st-century Malian people